LaDontae Henton (born January 6, 1992) is an American former professional basketball player. He played college basketball for Providence before playing professionally in Spain, the Philippines, NBA G League, Hungary and Israel. He is currently a special assistant to the head coach at Providence.

High school career
A 6'6" small forward, Henton went to Eastern High School in Lansing, Michigan, where he was a four-time first-team all-state player and averaged 22.2 points per game for his career.  He left as the fourth best rebounder in Michigan prep history, averaging 14.5 rebounds per game.

College career
Henton originally was set to attend Dayton, but after Dayton coach Brian Gregory left for Georgia Tech, he became new Providence coach Ed Cooley's first recruit.  In his freshman season, Henton averaged 14.3 points and 8.6 rebounds per game and was named to the Big East Conference All-Rookie team.

As a senior, Henton enjoyed a breakout season.  After leading the Big East in scoring at 19.7 points per game, he was named first-team All-conference and helped lead the Friars to their second consecutive NCAA tournament appearance for the first time since the 1988–89 and 1989–90 seasons.  He was also named the USBWA District I Player of the Year and an honorable mention All-American by the Associated Press.

Henton finished his Friar career with 2,059 points and 1,054 rebounds, becoming the second player in school history to achieve the 2000/1000 milestone (Ryan Gomes was the first).

Professional career
After going undrafted in the 2015 NBA draft, Henton joined the Golden State Warriors for the 2015 NBA Summer League. On August 21, 2015, he signed with Spanish League team CB Sevilla. In June 2016, he joined the Alaska Aces of the Philippine Basketball Association as the team's import for the 2016 PBA Governors' Cup. He led the Aces in the playoffs.

On October 30, 2016, Henton was selected by the Santa Cruz Warriors with the 10th overall pick in the 2016 NBA Development League Draft, however he was waived by the Warriors on November 10. On December 16, he was reacquired by Santa Cruz.

On September 27, 2017, Henton signed with Los Angeles Clippers as part of their training camp.

On November 5, 2018, Henton signed a one-month contract with BC Andorra.

On January 7, 2019, Henton signed with Atomerőmű SE for the rest of the season. In 20 games played for Atomerőmű, he averaged 14.6 points, 5.4 rebounds and 1.6 assists and 1.1 steals per game.

On July 28, 2019, Henton signed a one-year deal with Maccabi Ashdod of the Israeli Premier League.

On November 26, 2020, Henton signed with Hsinchu JKO Lioneers P. League+(Taiwanese professional basketball league).

Coaching career
On July 8, 2021, Henton was named to Ed Cooley's coaching staff at Providence as a special assistant to the head coach.

See also
 List of NCAA Division I men's basketball players with 2000 points and 1000 rebounds

References

External links
Providence Friars bio
RealGM profile

1992 births
Living people
Agua Caliente Clippers players
Alaska Aces (PBA) players
American expatriate basketball people in Hungary
American expatriate basketball people in Israel
American expatriate basketball people in the Philippines
American expatriate basketball people in Spain
American men's basketball players
Atomerőmű SE players
Basketball players from Michigan
BC Andorra players
Expatriate basketball people in Andorra
American expatriate basketball people in Andorra
Liga ACB players
Maccabi Ashdod B.C. players
Philippine Basketball Association imports
Providence Friars men's basketball players
Real Betis Baloncesto players
Santa Cruz Warriors players
Small forwards
Sportspeople from Lansing, Michigan
American expatriate basketball people in Taiwan
Hsinchu JKO Lioneers players
P. League+ imports